Amy Feldman (born 1981) is an American abstract painter from Brooklyn, New York.

Education 
Amy Feldman received a BFA degree in painting from the Rhode Island School of Design in Providence, Rhode Island in 2003. She then attended Rutgers University in New Brunswick, New Jersey where she received an MFA in Painting in 2008. She subsequently attended the Skowhegan School of Painting and Sculpture for a nine-week residency in 2009.

Feldman is the recipient of a Guggenheim Foundation Grant (2018) and Joan Mitchell Foundation Grant (2013).

Work

Feldman's work has been shown in galleries and museums since 2008. Her work is planned, casual and spontaneously painted with loosely geometric, graphic gestures in whites to dark grays on various whites to gray grounds.

The stark contrast between figure and ground in Feldman's paintings is initially arresting, then subsequently complicated, exploratory, and meditative. Feldman's bold, urgent, and large scale abstract paintings are often anthropomorphic and darkly humorous with psychologically charged imagery. Her stripped down abstract sign system addresses, among other things, topology, morphology, and the perception and transmission of information.

Feldman's artistic influences range from Cubism to the works of Henri Matisse, Jean Arp, Ellsworth Kelly, Shirley Jaffe, Mary Heilmann and Robert Ryman.

Feldman's work are in the permanent collections of the Museum of Contemporary Art in Chicago, the Sheldon Museum of Art in Lincoln, Nebraska, the Hall Art Foundation | Schloss Derneburg Museum in Derneburg, Germany, and the Vanhaerents Art Collection in Brussels, Belgium. She lives and works in Brooklyn, New York.

Exhibitions

Solo exhibitions
Goodnight Light: Eva Presenhuber, Zurich, Switzerland, 2022 
Mothercolor: Eva Presenhuber, New York City, New York, 2021 
Counter Ground: ANNAELLE Gallery, Stockholm, Sweden, 2018 
Nerve Reserve: James Cohan Gallery, New York City, New York, 2017
Breath Myth: Blain|Southern, Berlin, Germany, 2017
Psyche Shade: Ratio 3, San Francisco, California, 2016
Good Gloom: Corbett vs. Dempsey, Chicago, Illinois, 2016
Moon Decorum: Brand New Gallery, Milan, Italy, 2015
Trice Electric: ANNAELLE Gallery, Stockholm, Sweden, 2015
High Sign: Blackston Gallery, New York City, New York, 2014
Gray Area: Sorry, We're Closed Gallery, Brussels, Belgium, 2014
Stark Types: ANNAELLE Gallery, Stockholm, Sweden, 2013
Raw Graces: Gregory Lind Gallery, San Francisco, California, 2013

Selected group exhibitions
All That Is Solid Melts Into Air: Klaus Von Nichtssagend Gallery, New York, NY, 2019 
Mutual Ritual: 39 Great Jones, New York, NY, curated by Ugo Rondinone, 2019This and That: Some Recent Acquisitions: Hall Art Foundation | Schloss Derneburg Museum, Derneburg, Germany, 2018 nonObjectives: Sheldon Museum of Art, Lincoln, NE, curated by Walter Mason, 2017Playground Structure: Blain|Southern, London, UK, 2017Quicktime: University of the Arts, Philadelphia, PA, 2017Heartbreak Hotel: Invisible Exports, New York, NY, 2017MCA DNA: Riot Grrrls: Museum of Contemporary Art, Chicago, Illinois, curated by Michael Darling, 2016-2017The Congregation, Jack Hanley Gallery, New York, New York, curated by Joshua Abelow, 2016Amy Feldman, Lucio Fontana, Maximilian Schubert, Alan Wiener: 11R Gallery, New York, New York, 2016Face to Face: Palazzo Fruscione, Salerno, Italy, curated by Eugenio Viola, 2016New York Painting: Kunstmuseum BONN, Bonn Germany, curated by Christoph Schreier, 2015The Empire Strikes Back ARNDT Singapore, curated by Amir Shariat, 20152159 Miles: Museo Britanico Americano, Mexico City, and Casa Blanca, San Juan, PR, curated by Brand New Gallery (Milan), 2015This One's Optimistic: Pincushion: New Britain Museum of American Art, New Britain, CT, curated by Cary Smith, 2014The New York Moment: Museum of Contemporary Art, St. Etienne, France, curated by Lorand Hegyi, 2014Annual Invitational Exhibition, The Academy of Arts and Letters, New York City, New York, 2013An Exhibition on the Centenary of the 1913 Armory Show: DECENTER'': Henry Street Settlement/Abrons Art Center, New York City, New York, curated by Daniel Palmer and Andrianna Campbell, 2013

Awards
The Pollock-Krasner Foundation Grant, 2021
John Simon Guggenheim Memorial Foundation Fellowship, 2018
Casa Wabi Residency, Oaxaca, Mexico, 2014
Chandelier Creative Residency, Montauk, New York, 2014
Annual 2013 Painters & Sculptors Grant, The Joan Mitchell Foundation, New York, New York, 2013
Andree Stone Emerging Artist Prize, Expo Chicago, Chicago, IL, 2013
The Marie Walsh Sharpe Foundation Fellowship, 2012-2013
Henry Street Settlement/Abrons Art Center AIRspace Residency, 2011-2012
The Robert Motherwell Fellowship, The MacDowell Colony, 2011-2012
Yaddo Fellowship, 2011
New Jersey State Council on the Arts Fellowship, 2011
VCUarts Fountainhead Arts Fellowship at Virginia Commonwealth University 2008-2009

Further reading
Rafael Rivas, Giving a F@*%: Forms of Feminism in Response to Riot Grrrls, Museum of Contemporary Art, Chicago, May 23, 2017’’
Osman Can Yerebakan, Amy Feldman - Nerve Reserve, Artspeak, May 6, 2017
Christoph Schreier, "Painting as Pictorial Art New York Painting in the 21st Century", Kunstmuseum Bonn, Hirmer, 2015
Barry Schwabsky, "The Zeitgeist of No Zeitgeist", The Nation, January 26, 2015
Amanda Dalla Villa Adams, Amy Feldman, Artforum, 2015
Michael Wilson, Amy Feldman, Artforum, 2014
Howard Hurst, "Who Has the Cure for "Zombie Formalism"?", Hyperallergic, December 17, 2014
Raphael Rubinstein, "Amy Feldman's Condensed Poetics", catalogue essay for solo exhibition: High Sign, 2014 
Barry Schwabsky, "Great Gray", catalogue essay for solo exhibition: Stark Types, 2013 
Jonathan Curiel, Amy Feldman's New Western Vistas, The San Francisco Weekly, Mar 20, 2013
Nirmala Nataraj, "Amy Feldman Melds Poise, Rough Edges", The San Francisco Chronicle, March 6, 2013
Gregory Lind, "Amy Feldman", catalogue essay for solo exhibition: Raw Graces, 2013 
Amanda Parmer, "Amy Feldman: Blackston", Art in America, October 2012, Issue No. 9, p. 174-175 
Roberta Smith, "Art in Review, Amy Feldman: Dark Selects", The New York Times, Friday July 13, 2012
Stephen Westfall, "Tough Love", catalogue essay for solo exhibition: Dark Selects, 2012

External links

References 

Abstract painters
American abstract artists
American contemporary painters
American women painters
Casualist artists
Minimalist artists
Painters from New York (state)
21st-century American painters
21st-century American women artists
Rutgers University alumni
Rhode Island School of Design alumni
Skowhegan School of Painting and Sculpture alumni
1981 births
Living people